Poly(3,4-ethylenedioxythiophene) (PEDOT or PEDT; IUPAC name poly(2,3-dihydrothieno[3,4-b][1,4]dioxane-5,7-diyl)) is a conducting polymer based on 3,4-ethylenedioxythiophene or EDOT. It was first reported by Bayer AG in 1989.

Polymer
PEDOT possesses many advantageous properties compared to earlier conducting polythiophenes like 3-alkylthiophenes. For example, the polymer is optically transparent in its conducting state and has high stability, moderate band gap, and low redox potential. Its major disadvantage is its poor solubility, which is partly circumvented by use of composite materials such as PEDOT:PSS and PEDOT-TMA.

The polymer is generated by oxidation.  The process begins with production of the radical cation of EDOT monomer, [C2H4O2C4H2S]+.  This cation adds to a neutral EDOT followed by deprotonation. The idealized conversion using peroxydisulfate is shown:
n C2H4O2C4H2S + n (OSO3)22−   →  [C2H4O2C4S]n  +  2n HOSO3−

Polymerization is usually conducted in the presence of polystyrene sulfonate (PSS), which acts as a template. PSS also provides a counter ion, which balances the charges in the reaction and hinders the formation of by-products such as 3,4-ethylenedioxy-2(5H)-thiophenone, and keeps the PEDOT monomers dispersed in water or aqueous solutions.  The resulting PEDOT:PSS composite can be deposited on a conductive support such as platinum, gold, glassy carbon, and indium tin oxide.

Uses
Applications of PEDOT include electrochromic displays and antistatics.

PEDOT has also been proposed for photovoltaics, printed wiring, and sensors. PEDOT has been proposed for use in biocompatible interfaces.

Further reading

References

Organic polymers
Organic semiconductors
Transparent electrodes
Conductive polymers